Susan Pran Krumdieck  is a New Zealand engineering academic. She was an academic from 2000 to 2020, and the first woman appointed to full professor in engineering in 2014 at the University of Canterbury. She is currently Professor and Chair in Energy Transition at Heriot-Watt University.

Academic career

After a PhD titled  'Experimental characterization and modeling for the growth rate of oxide coatings from liquid solutions of metalorganic precursors by ultrasonic pulsed injection in a cold wall low pressure reactor'  at the University of Colorado, she moved to the University of Canterbury, rising to full professor. She continues her research work on titanium dioxide (TiO2). One of her PhD students, when experimenting with TiO2, created a black TiO2 coating. Initially regarded as an undesirable outcome, it was later discovered that this new coating had anti-microbial properties under normal light.

She teaches and researches in the field of energy transition engineering.

In the 2021 New Year Honours, Krumdieck was appointed an honorary Member of the New Zealand Order of Merit, for services to sustainability research and engineering.

Other
From 2018 onwards, Krumdieck has been a member of the Upper North Island Supply Chain Strategy (UNISCS) working group. The group has been investigating ports in the upper half of the North Island, coastal shipping and port supply chains. One of the issues they consider is whether to reopen part of the North Auckland Line and build a new branch line, Marsden Point Branch, to connect to Northport.

Selected works 
Blair, Niebert, Pons, Dirk, and Krumdieck, Susan (2019). Electrification in remote communities: Assessing the value of electricity using a community action research approach in Kabakaburi, Guyana. Sustainability, 11(9), 2566.
 Gyamfi, Samuel, Susan Krumdieck, and Tania Urmee. "Residential peak electricity demand response—Highlights of some behavioural issues." Renewable and Sustainable Energy Reviews 25 (2013): 71–77.
 Kreith, Frank, and Susan Krumdieck. Principles of sustainable energy systems. Crc Press, 2013.

 Gyamfi, Samuel, and Susan Krumdieck. "Price, environment and security: Exploring multi-modal motivation in voluntary residential peak demand response." Energy Policy 39, no. 5 (2011): 2993–3004.
 Krumdieck, Susan, Shannon Page, and André Dantas. "Urban form and long-term fuel supply decline: A method to investigate the peak oil risks to essential activities." Transportation Research Part A: Policy and Practice 44, no. 5 (2010): 306–322.
 Gyamfi, Samuel, and Susan Krumdieck. "Scenario analysis of residential demand response at network peak periods." Electric Power Systems Research 93 (2012): 32–38.
Krumdieck, S. Transition engineering: Building a sustainable future. CRC Press, 2020.

References

External links
 People behind the Science podcast episode
  
 
Susan Krumdieck at Global Association for Transition Engineering (GATE)
Podcast of Susan Krumdieck on transition engineering at the University of Otago
Howard, Maureen (26 June 2019). "Why we need Transition Engineering for a low carbon future – with Susan Krumdieck". Eco Living in Action.

Living people
Academics of Heriot-Watt University
New Zealand women academics
University of Colorado alumni
Academic staff of the University of Canterbury
New Zealand women engineers
21st-century women engineers
Year of birth missing (living people)
New Zealand women writers
Honorary Members of the New Zealand Order of Merit